Srinagar may refer to:
Srinagar, summer capital of Jammu and Kashmir, India
Srinagar District, Jammu and Kashmir, India, includes Srinagar city and Dal Lake
Srinagar, Uttarakhand, a city in Uttarakhand, India
Sreenagar Upazila, a town in Bangladesh